James Robert Phizacklea (29 September 1898 – 28 May 1971) was an English professional footballer who played as a left back. Hailing from Barrow-in-Furness, he began his senior career in the Football League Third Division North with hometown club Barrow in June 1921. Phizacklea scored three goals in 71 League appearances for the Holker Street club before moving to fellow Third Division North outfit Nelson on a free transfer in the summer of 1924. He made his Nelson debut in the first match of the 1924–25 season, a 0–1 defeat away at Southport, and went on to play 21 competitive matches for the club. In January 1925, Phizacklea joined Football League First Division side Preston North End for a fee of £1,000.

After making 22 appearances for Preston, Phizacklea moved to South Shields, where he played 68 League games during two years with the club. Between 1928 and 1930 he played in the Southern Football League with Thames Association. He returned north in August 1930 to sign for Stockport County, but failed to make a first-team appearance for the side and subsequently had spells with Guildford City and as an amateur player with Roneo Sports in Romford. Phizacklea died in the village of Ardleigh, Essex, in 1971 at the age of 72.

References

1898 births
1971 deaths
Footballers from Barrow-in-Furness
English footballers
Association football defenders
Barrow A.F.C. players
Nelson F.C. players
Preston North End F.C. players
South Shields F.C. (1889) players
Thames A.F.C. players
Stockport County F.C. players
Guildford City F.C. players
English Football League players
Footballers from Cumbria